Upwey railway station serves the urban areas of Broadwey, Upwey and Littlemoor which are northern suburbs of Weymouth, Dorset, England.

History

The first station near this location, simply named Upwey, was opened in 1871 by the Great Western Railway (GWR). On 19 April 1886 that station was replaced by the current station, then named Upwey Junction, a railway junction that opened south of the original station to provide access to the single track Abbotsbury branch. The branch was absorbed into the GWR and survived for 66 years before closure under British Railways in 1952. On the closure of the branch Upwey Junction was renamed Upwey and Broadwey on 1 December 1952, and took its current name, Upwey, on 12 May 1980.

During the Network SouthEast era, the station was refurbished with the trademark red lighting poles, station benches and monitor screens for train arrivals. Rubble from the rebuilt Weymouth station was used to fill in the former Abbotsbury platform for use as a car park. This was done in time for the extension of electrification from Bournemouth to Weymouth in 1988.

Two further stations had Upwey in their name. To the north of Upwey Junction existed a halt called Upwey Wishing Well Halt, while around the bend on the Abbotsbury branch was a station which had originally been called Broadwey. However its name was changed to Upwey as it kept being confused with Broadway, Worcestershire, also on the Great Western Railway.

Thomas Hardy wrote a poem At the Railway Station, Upway, about waiting for a train at a country station.  In the days of steam, a favourite excursion was from Weymouth to Upwey, and then on to tea at the Upwey Wishing Well by charabanc.

Accidents and incidents 
On 24 January 2013, a passenger train caught fire at Upwey.

Services

Services at Weymouth are operated by South Western Railway and Great Western Railway.

On Sundays, this is reduced to between three and five trains per day depending on the time of year.

References

Bibliography

External links

Railway stations in Dorset
Rail junctions in England
Railway stations in Great Britain opened in 1886
Former Great Western Railway stations
Railway stations served by Great Western Railway
Railway stations served by South Western Railway
DfT Category F2 stations